The Teqe Mosque is a mosque in Gjirokastër, Albania. It is a Cultural Monument of Albania.

It was described by famed explorer Evliya Çelebi in the 17th century, but its current form is the work of an Ahmet Çelebi in 1773. A inscription dates it to 1732 to 1733 (Hijri year 1145). Though named Teqe by its first descriptor, the locals call it Mesh Mosque. Still standing in 1967 and originally slated for demolition soon after, it was reprieved with cultural monument status in 1973.

References

Cultural Monuments of Albania
Buildings and structures in Gjirokastër
Mosques in Albania